Rea Vipingo is a company that operates sisal plantations in Kenya and Tanzania.  The company's headquarters are located in Nairobi.  Its stock was listed between 1996, and 2015 on the Nairobi Stock Exchange.

It deals with the cultivation of agave in its plantations in Kenya (in Kwibezi and Vipingo) and, through the subsidiary Amboni Plantations Limited, in Tanzania and with the marketing of both the sisal fiber obtained from it, of the products (yarn, twine, rope) made with the fiber in the Amboni Spinning Mill production plant, owned by the company and which is located near the city of Tanga, in Tanzania.

See also
 Nairobi Stock Exchange
 Centum Investment Company Limited

External links
Rea Vipingo
Rea Vipingo page at Wiggleswort Fibres
Rea Vipingo's stock's page at Nairobist

References

Sisal
Agriculture companies of Kenya
Agriculture in Tanzania
Companies based in Nairobi
1939 establishments in Kenya
Companies established in 1939
Companies formerly listed on the Nairobi Securities Exchange